Though Sega officially discontinued its Dreamcast video game console in 2001, and released the console's last official game in 2007, Dreamcast homebrew developers continued to release unofficial games for the console. Unlike homebrew communities for other consoles, the Dreamcast homebrew developers are organized in development teams, such as Redspotgames.

Community 

Redspotgames is a German homebrew publisher.

NG:DEV.TEAM

Games 
This is a partial list of games.  For a more complete list, see List of Dreamcast homebrew games
 
 
 
 
 
  (R4)

References

Further reading 

 
 
 
 
 
 
 
 

Dreamcast
Homebrew software
Video game development